Dobet Gnahoré (born 17 June 1982) is a singer from Côte d'Ivoire. The daughter of percussionist Boni Gnahoré, she plays with the group Na Afriki, consisting mainly of French and Tunisian musicians, who accompany her with the guitar, sanza, the balafon, the calebasse and bongos. Due to the civil war, she moved to France in 1999. In 2004, Gnahoré released her debut album Ano Neko. In 2006, She was a nominee at the BBC Radio 3 Awards for World Music for Newcomer. In 2010, she shared an award for Best Urban/Alternative Performance with India.Arie at the 52nd Grammy Awards.

Early life
A self-taught musician, who incorporates elements of song, dance, percussion and theatre into her repertoire, she is the daughter of percussionist Boni Gnahoré, who performs with her and the sister of Kiff No Beat band member Black K. She settled in Marseille in 1999 due to the civil war.

Career
In France, Gnahoré met guitarist Colin Laroche de Féline and decided to form a band, Na Afriki. It consists of mainly French and Tunisian musicians, who accompany her with the sanza, the balafon, the calebasse and bongos. The group toured Congo, Gabon, Chad and Equatorial Guinea in the 2000s, and aspects of music from a number of African countries are evident, including Cameroonian bikutsi, Congolese, East African rumba and Manding music, alongside reggae. Her lyrics often deal with pressing social issues, including the importance of family and AIDS. She can sing in seven different languages. Her music ranges from "delicate ballads to upbeat African grooves".

In 2004, Gnahoré released her debut album Ano Neko ('let's create together'). She was a nominee at the 2006 BBC Radio 3 Awards for World Music for Newcomer and in 2010 she shared an award for Best Urban/Alternative Performance  for the song “Pearls” with India.Arie at the 52nd Grammy Awards.

Discography

Albums
 Ano Neko, 2004
 Na Afriki, 2007
 Djekpa La You, 2010
 Na Drê, 2014
 Miziki, 2018
 Couleur, 2021

References

External links 

Dobet Gnahoré's website
Facebook page

21st-century Ivorian women singers
Grammy Award winners
1982 births
Living people
Place of birth missing (living people) 
Musicians from Marseille
Ivorian emigrants to France
21st-century French women singers